A Wexford County Council election was held in County Wexford in Ireland on 24 May 2019 as part of that year's local elections. All 34 councillors were elected for a five-year term of office from 6 local electoral areas (LEAs) by single transferable vote.  The 2018 LEA boundary review committee replaced the four LEAs used in the 2014 elections, each of which had more than the seven seat maximum set in the 2018 terms of reference. The changes were enacted by statutory instrument (S.I.) No. 637/2018.

Fianna Fáil gained an additional seat boosting their numbers to 12 overall while also increasing their vote by almost 3%. The party was boosted by the candidature of Malcolm Byrne in Ireland South. However outgoing Cathaoirleach Keith Doyle proved to be a casualty in the Enniscorthy LEA. Fine Gael retained 9 seats overall while Labour returned 2 seats again; this time both from the Wexford LEA. Independents increased their numbers by 2 seats from 6 to 8. The elections were very disappointing for Sinn Féin who lost 3 seats, including 1 to Aontú, to be reduced to just 2 seats in total.

Results by party

Results by local electoral area

Enniscorthy

Gorey

Kilmuckridge

New Ross

Rosslare

Wexford

Results by gender

Changes Since 2019 Local Elections
† Gorey Fianna Fáil Cllr Malcolm Byrne was elected to the Dáil as Teachta Dála (TD) for Wexford at the by-election in November 2019. Andrew Bolger was co-opted to fill the vacancy on 20 January 2020.

Footnotes

References

Sources
 
 
 

2019 Irish local elections
2019